Kenny Gajewski (born October 23, 1971) is an American softball coach who is the current head coach at Oklahoma State.

Early life and education
Gajewski graduated from the University of Oklahoma. He played baseball for the 1994 Oklahoma baseball team, that won the national championship.

Coaching career

Florida (asst.)
On July 13, 2012, Florida added Gajewski to the softball staff as an assistant coach under head coach Tim Walton.

Oklahoma State
On July 13, 2015, Kenny Gajewski was announced as the new head coach of the Oklahoma State softball program.

Head coaching record

College

References

1971 births
Living people
American softball coaches
Cal State Dominguez Hills Toros baseball players
Cerritos Falcons baseball players
Oklahoma Sooners baseball players
Oklahoma Sooners baseball coaches
Kansas State Wildcats baseball coaches
Florida Gators softball coaches
Oklahoma State Cowgirls softball coaches